Silent Spring is a 2011 symphonic poem for orchestra by the American composer Steven Stucky.  The piece was written to commemorate the fiftieth anniversary of the environmental science book Silent Spring by Rachel Carson and was commissioned by the Pittsburgh Symphony Orchestra in collaboration with the Rachel Carson Institute at Chatham University.  The work was premiered in Pittsburgh on February 17, 2012, with the Pittsburgh Symphony Orchestra conducted by Manfred Honeck.

Composition
Though Silent Spring is composed in a single movement, Stucky fashioned the work into four sections named from Carson's works: "The Sea Around Us" (an eponymously titled book by Carson), "The Lost Woods" (the title of a letter written by Carson), "Rivers of Death" (a chapter title in Silent Spring), and "Silent Spring."  Stucky intended these sections to "create an emotional journey from beginning to end without referring specifically to the scientific details."

In the program notes to the score, Stucky commented on the "at once 'abstract' and 'programmatic'"  elements of the work, writing:

Reception
Reviewing the world premiere, Andrew Druckenbrod of the Pittsburgh Post-Gazette called Silent Spring "a brilliant, if unsettling, work" and declared, "Before I heard this work, which reflects the dire consequences the book outlines, I didn't realize how much I yearned for an instrumental meditation on the state of the environment."  Mark Kanny of the Pittsburgh Tribune-Review also lauded the work, especially noting the performance by the Pittsburgh Symphony Orchestra.  The New York Times's Allan Kozinn, reviewing the New York City premiere in Carnegie Hall, also praised the piece, writing, "Evoking Carson's argument for conservation in a musical score is a tall order. But Mr. Stucky, the Pittsburgh orchestra's composer in residence (...), typically draws on a vast timbral palette to create vivid textures. And with the title as a prompt, it is easy to hear what he had in mind in this explosive, shape-shifting 17-minute tone poem."  Kozinn further remarked:

References

Compositions by Steven Stucky
2011 compositions
21st-century classical music
Symphonic poems
Music commissioned by the Pittsburgh Symphony Orchestra